Rochelle "Shelley" Berkley (née Levine; born January 20, 1951) is an American businesswoman, politician and attorney who served as U.S. Representative for  from 1999 to 2013. In 2012, she was an unsuccessful candidate for the U.S. Senate. She is a member of the Democratic Party.

Early life, education, and legal career
Berkley was born Rochelle Levine in New York City, the daughter of Estelle (née Colonomos – see Kalonymus) and George Levine. Her paternal grandparents were Russian Jews and her mother's family were Sephardic Jews from Ottoman-era Thessaloniki, now in Macedonia, northern Greece.

Berkley moved with her family to Nevada when she was a junior high school student, attending Fremont Junior High. After completing high school, she became the first member of her family to attend college when she enrolled as an undergraduate at the University of Nevada, Las Vegas. She became a member of Delta Zeta sorority. Elected student body president of the Consolidated Students of the University of Nevada, Las Vegas her senior year, Shelley graduated with honors in 1972, earning a B.A. in Political Science.

After obtaining her J.D. degree in 1976 from the University of San Diego School of Law, Shelley returned to Las Vegas and began her professional career. Berkley practiced law for several years, mainly as a member of the legal counsel for several Las Vegas casinos. She also served as the national director for the American Hotel-Motel Association.

Early political career
Berkley served in the Nevada Assembly from 1982 to 1984 and was involved in civic affairs locally. She also served on the Nevada University and Community College System Board of Regents from 1990 to 1998, and was appointed vice chair.

U.S. House of Representatives

Campaigns
In 1996, U.S. Congressman John Ensign won re-election in Nevada's 1st congressional district with 50.1% of the vote, a 6.6% margin over Bob Coffin, the Democratic candidate. The day after, Berkley filed papers to run in the district. She raised $206,000 in the first six months and $410,000 in the next six months. Berkley was Democrats' dream candidate, as she easily won the primary with 81.5% of the vote. Ensign decided to retire in order to run against U.S. Senator Harry Reid in the very close and competitive 1998 senate election. In the general election, she defeated Republican Don Chairez, a District Court Judge in Clark County with 49.2% of the vote.

In 2000, she won re-election with 51.7% against State Senator Jon Porter. In 2002, she defeated Republican Las Vegas City Councilwoman Lynette Boggs with 53.7%.

Tenure
Congresswoman Berkley represented Nevada's 1st congressional district from 1999 to 2013, serving seven terms as a member of the U.S. House of Representatives. The district includes most of the city of Las Vegas as well as the Las Vegas Strip and the city of North Las Vegas. She is the second woman elected to Congress from Nevada, the first woman elected to the 1st district and the first elected as a Democrat.

Berkley is a member of the New Democrat Coalition. She views her top priorities as affordable health care coverage for all Americans, veteran's rights and alternative energy.  Berkley is also strongly opposed to the building of a nuclear waste repository in Yucca Mountain, Nevada.

In 2011, Berkley voted for the National Defense Authorization Act for Fiscal Year 2012 as part of a controversial provision that allows the government and the military to indefinitely detain American citizens and others without trial.

Ethics investigation and related criticism
On September 5, 2011, a New York Times exposé detailed the actions that Berkley took as a member of Congress that she and her husband financially benefited from. The Times noted that, "Ms. Berkley's actions were among a series over the last five years in which she pushed legislation or twisted the arms of federal regulators to pursue an agenda that is aligned with the business interests of her husband, Dr. Larry Lehrner."

On September 19, 2011, the ethics watchdog Citizens for Responsibility and Ethics in Washington (CREW) released their annual Most Corrupt Members of Congress report. The report listed Berkley in the "Dishonorable Mention" category. Berkley was named in CREW's Most Corrupt Members of Congress report for the second year in a row in 2012.

On July 9, 2012, the United States House Committee on Ethics voted unanimously to form an investigative subcommittee to see whether Berkley used her official position to advocate for policy that benefited her family's financial situation. More specifically, Berkley is accused of pushing healthcare legislation that would benefit her husband's medical practice. Berkley was also blamed for her efforts to block the closure of a kidney transplant center where her husband was employed.

In 1996 and 1997, while working as a government affairs adviser for Las Vegas Sands, during the construction of The Venetian Berkley advised her employer to make campaign contributions to two Clark County Commissioners and two Clark County judges to secure their approval for the new hotel. Berkley also suggested to her employer, the option of hiring an uncle of County Commissioner Erin Kenny and to grant a daiquiri concession to commission chairwoman Yvonne Atkinson Gates.  Berkley also advised making campaign contributions to the two judges because they "tend to help those who helped them."

Fundraising
Berkley announced in June 2012 that she would turn over all $11,900 in campaign contributions from indicted lobbyist Harvery Whittemore to the U.S. Treasury. Whittemore was charged with violating  campaign finance laws and misleading law enforcement. Before pledging to give up the contributions from Whittemore, Berkley said that she was holding his contributions in escrow while awaiting the outcome of the investigation against him.

As of July 2012, Berkley had raised $4 million in contributions for her campaign to unseat Senator Dean Heller. Heller had raised $4.4 million.

Interest groups
As a 6th term congresswoman Berkley was endorsed by a number of interest groups. The themes of some groups endorsing Berkley included education, environmental protections, and gender equality in politics. Berkley received endorsements from groups such as The National Education Association, The Sierra Club and The National Women's Political Caucus.

Berkley has been given various scores from a variety of interest groups. These groups include topics ranging from abortion issues, agriculture, criminal issues, animal rights, budget and taxes and foreign aid. NARAL Pro-Choice America gave Berkley a 100% in 2010, while the National Right to Life Committee gave her a 0% rating.

The American Farm Bureau Federation gave Berkley a 33% rating in 2010 the topic of agriculture, while the National Farm Workers Union gave Berkley a 100% rating. Other interest groups Berkley has received High ratings from Citizens United for Rehabilitation of Errants, and Defenders of Wildlife Fund. Groups that Berkley has received poor ratings from include the National Taxpayers Union and Peace Action.

Issues

Energy policy

On June 26, 2009, Berkley voted for the American Clean Energy and Security Act, which would have implemented a cap-and-trade system similar to the regulations proposed by the Reagan administration in the 1980s, then known as "emissions trading."

Health care
Berkley voted for the Patient Protection and Affordable Care Act of 2010.

Israel
Berkley is a supporter of Israel and is a member of the pro-Israel group American Israel Public Affairs Committee.

Support for Iraq war
On October 10, 2002, Berkley was among the 81 House Democrats who voted in favor of authorizing the invasion of Iraq.

Wall Street bailout
On October 3, 2008, Berkley voted for the controversial Emergency Economic Stabilization Act of 2008, which created the Troubled Asset Relief Program (TARP) that bailed out Wall Street banks.

Committee assignments
Committee on Ways and Means
Subcommittee on Social Security
Subcommittee on Select Revenue Measures

2012 U.S. Senate election

Berkley announced that she would run for the United States Senate in April 2011 to succeed John Ensign, who resigned amidst an ethics scandal. She secured the Democratic nomination in the June primary and faced incumbent Senator Dean Heller in the November elections.
She narrowly lost the election.

Personal life
In March 1999, Berkley married Dr. Lawrence Lehrner, a practicing nephrologist in Las Vegas. Both Berkley and Lehrner have two children from prior marriages.

Lehrner seldom campaigns with his wife. Berkley says about her husband, "He works about 12 hours a day, seven days a week. I call him a doctor's doctor." Lehrner's medical practice has received attention during the campaign due to the House Ethics Committee's investigation into Berkley's efforts to save a kidney transplant center in which her husband has a financial interest. Laura Meyers of the Las Vegas Review-Journal wrote, "Having Lehrner on the campaign trail with Berkley could remind voters of the ethics investigation—expose him to uncomfortable questions."

Former U.S. Rep. Shelley Berkley has been hired as CEO and senior provost of the Touro College and University System in Nevada and California. Her responsibilities for this position started in January 2014.

See also
 List of Jewish members of the United States Congress
 Women in the United States House of Representatives

References

External links

 Shelley Berkley for Senate official campaign site
 A Guide to the Shelley Berkley campaign ephemera collection. 93-36. Special Collections, University Libraries, University of Nevada, Reno.
 

|-

|-

1951 births
20th-century American politicians
20th-century American women politicians
21st-century American Jews
21st-century American women politicians
21st-century American politicians
American people of Greek-Jewish descent
American people of Russian-Jewish descent
American Sephardic Jews
American women lawyers
American Zionists
Democratic Party members of the United States House of Representatives from Nevada
Female members of the United States House of Representatives
Jewish members of the United States House of Representatives
Jewish women politicians
Living people
Democratic Party members of the Nevada Assembly
Nevada lawyers
Politicians from Carson City, Nevada
Politicians from Las Vegas
Politicians from New York City
University of Nevada, Las Vegas alumni
University of Nevada, Las Vegas faculty
University of San Diego School of Law alumni
Women in Nevada politics
Women state legislators in Nevada